Caledonia is a census-designated place in Traill County, North Dakota, United States. A former boomtown of the 1870s and the era of the Hudson's Bay Company steamship trade, the community has now all but virtually disappeared.

An unincorporated community, it was designated as part of the U.S. Census Bureau's Participant Statistical Areas Program on March 31, 2010. It was not counted separately during the 2000 Census, but was included in the 2010 Census, where a population of 39 was reported.

History
First called Goose River, the community was established as a post for the Hudson's Bay Company steamships which operated on the Red River of the North. Caledonia became an early boom town in the Red River Valley and also became a post for a stagecoach line which lead north to Fort Garry — now called Winnipeg. Upon the creation of Traill County in 1875, Caledonia was designated as the county seat. However, in that same year, the Hudson's Bay Company closed their U.S. posts including the one at Caledonia. When James J. Hill's railroad crossed Traill County, it bypassed Caledonia. The steamboat industry soon floundered and the county seat was moved to Hillsboro in 1896.

Geography
Caledonia sits on the banks of the Goose River near the confluence with the Red River of the North.

Demographics

Notes

Census-designated places in Traill County, North Dakota
Census-designated places in North Dakota
Unincorporated communities in North Dakota
Unincorporated communities in Traill County, North Dakota